USS LST-942 was an  in the United States Navy. Like many of her class, she was not named and is properly referred to by her hull designation.

Construction
LST-942 was laid down on 1 August 1944, at Hingham, Massachusetts, by the Bethlehem-Hingham Shipyard; launched on 6 September 1944; and commissioned on 26 September 1944.

Service history
During World War II LST-942 was assigned to the Asiatic-Pacific theater and participated in the Visayan Island landings in April 1945.

Following the war, she performed occupation duty in the Far East until mid-February 1946. LST-942 returned to the United States and was decommissioned on 26 June 1946, and struck from the Navy list on 31 July, that same year. On 10 June 1948, the ship was sold to the Humble Oil & Refining Co., of Houston, Texas, for operation.

Awards
LST-942 earned one battle star for World War II service.

Notes

Citations

Bibliography 

Online resources

External links
 

 

1944 ships
LST-542-class tank landing ships
Ships built in Hingham, Massachusetts
World War II amphibious warfare vessels of the United States